David Flower is a British astronomer and physical chemist, an emeritus professor in the Durham University Department of Physics. He is editor in chief of the Monthly Notices of the Royal Astronomical Society (MNRAS). He became editor in chief after a long term as an MNRAS editorial board member. He is a Fellow of the Royal Astronomical Society, and a Fellow of the Royal Society of Arts. 

Flower's research is on the physics and chemistry of the interstellar medium, including atomic and molecular collision physics and astrochemistry. He has authored a book entitled "Molecular Collisions in the Interstellar Medium" which was published in 2007 by Cambridge University Press of the United Kingdom. He has a long list of research published in peer review journals.

References

Year of birth missing (living people)
Living people
Academic journal editors
British astrophysicists
Place of birth missing (living people)